John Stoltenberg (born 1944) is an American author, activist, magazine editor, college lecturer, playwright, and theater reviewer who identifies his political perspective as radical feminist. For several years he has worked for DC Metro Theater Arts and is currently its executive editor. He has written three books, two collections of his essays and a novel. He was the life partner of Andrea Dworkin for 30 years and has lived with his husband, Joe Hamilton, for over 15 years.

Education and career
Stoltenberg studied philosophy, focusing on the philosophy of religion. He holds a Master of Divinity from Union Theological Seminary and a Master of Fine Arts in Theatre Arts from Columbia University School of the Arts. In undergraduate and graduate school, he began writing, producing, directing, and acting in plays. Upon graduation, he became the writer-in-residence and administrative director for the influential experimental theater company The Open Theater, whose artistic director was Joseph Chaikin. Meanwhile, Stoltenberg's own plays were produced off-Broadway, and he won a New York State Arts Council grant to be a playwright.

In the 1980s, John began his career as a magazine editor. He worked as the managing editor at Essence, Working Woman, Lear's, and later AARP: The Magazine. Stoltenberg currently serves as executive editor and Communications Advisor for DC Metro Theater Arts, where he publishes theater reviews, interviews, and essays about live theater in Washington, D.C. In 2015, John produced a one-woman play titled Aftermath, which was an edited version of an unpublished essay by Andrea Dworkin. It was edited and directed for the stage by Adam Thorburn.

Writings
Stoltenberg has written many essays and speeches, as well as a novel, reflecting his pro-feminist sexual politics. Several appeared in the book For Men Against Sexism: A Book of Readings (1977): "Refusing to Be a Man", "Toward Gender Justice", and "Eroticism and Violence in the Father-Son Relationship". 

In 1989, he published a collection of his essays, Refusing to Be a Man: Essays on Sex and Justice. Lesbian author Rita Mae Brown stated the book carefully identifies the process by which male identification "affects and distorts men's most intimate capacities." This was followed in 1993 by a second collection The End of Manhood: A Book for Men of Conscience. 

In 2013, he published the novel, GONERZ. He has stated the writings of Andrea Dworkin have been the inspiration for his own and he dedicated all three books to her. His work is included in several anthologies including Feminism and Men: Reconstructing Gender Relations and The New Politics of Masculinity: Men, Power and Resistance. Stoltenberg has been credited with the quote: "Pornography tells lies about women. But pornography tells the truth about men."

Personal life
Born and raised in Minnesota, in his early life John was married to a woman and lived within prescribed sexist marital roles. After that, John has lived as an out gay man who also uses the term queer. He chose to spend his life with the radical feminist and lesbian, Andrea Dworkin. They were introduced by a mutual friend, a theater director, in 1974, at a meeting of the then-fledgling Gay Academic Union. Later in 1974, after walking out of a poetry reading—a benefit for the War Resisters League in Greenwich Village—due to the misogynist content, they began their decades-long intellectual and personal relationship. 

Their agreement was that while they would always live together, they could have relationships outside of their partnership and John did have relationships with men. John and Andrea planned never to marry unless one of two things occurred. As Andrea stated to The New York Times in 1985, "unless one of us is terminally ill or jailed for political activity", as she had been, traumatically, at the Women's House of Detention in New York at the age of eighteen. While they intended for the 1985 article to make clear they were not heterosexual, the "editor refused to allow the writer to identify us as gay and lesbian, as we had asked." They married in 1998, due to her ill health. 

Their life of 31 years together ended in 2005 with Dworkin's unexpected death from an enlarged heart. Since then, John has lived with his husband, Joe Hamilton, in Washington, D.C. 

See also Andrea Dworkin § Relationship with John Stoltenberg.

Activism
In addition to joining Dworkin in marches to protest against pornography, Stoltenberg founded Men Against Pornography in New York City, the male branch of Women Against Pornography. In the mid-'80s, he created and facilitated "The Pose Workshop", which entailed clothed men adopting the poses that women strike in pornographic shots with direction from other attendees, a version of which was broadcast on BBC television. He used that as an empathy-builder with young men on college campuses and at anti-sexist men's conferences across the US.

He was a founder of the group Men Can Stop Rape and developed the group's “My Strength” poster campaign which aims to educate young men on sexual relationships, consent, and rape. 

He is also the creative director of the group's "My Duty" sexual-assault-prevention media campaign, which is licensed to the United States Department of Defense's Sexual Assault Prevention and Response Office.

Selected bibliography

Books
 
  Reprinted as:  Pdf.

Chapters in books
 
 
 
 
 
 
 
 
 
 
Reprinted as

Journal articles
 
 
  Article on the Promise Keepers.

References

External links
 Living with Andrea Dworkin, Stoltenberg's account originally published in Lambda Book Report (May/June 1994)
 Imagining Life Without Andrea, transcript of Stoltenberg's extemporaneous speech to the Take Back the Night Rally Honoring Andrea Dworkin (30 April 2005).

1944 births
20th-century American male writers
20th-century American non-fiction writers
20th-century American LGBT people
21st-century American male writers
21st-century American non-fiction writers
21st-century American LGBT people
AARP people
American feminist writers
American gay writers
American magazine editors
American male non-fiction writers
American people of German descent
American people of Norwegian descent
American women's rights activists
Anti-pornography feminists
Gay feminists
Living people
Writers from California
Date of birth missing (living people)